Tradewinds is a census-designated place (CDP) in San Patricio County, Texas, United States. The population was 180 at the 2010 census.

Geography
Tradewinds is located at  (27.992077, -97.261811).

According to the United States Census Bureau, the CDP has a total area of 1.1 square miles (2.8 km2), all land.

Demographics
As of the census of 2000, there were 163 people, 43 households, and 36 families residing in the CDP. The population density was 151.1 people per square mile (58.3/km2). There were 54 housing units at an average density of 50.1/sq mi (19.3/km2). The racial makeup of the CDP was 89.57% White, 9.20% from other races, and 1.23% from two or more races. Hispanic or Latino of any race were 77.30% of the population.

There were 43 households, out of which 62.8% had children under the age of 18 living with them, 65.1% were married couples living together, 11.6% had a female householder with no husband present, and 14.0% were non-families. 9.3% of all households were made up of individuals, and 7.0% had someone living alone who was 65 years of age or older. The average household size was 3.79 and the average family size was 3.95.

In the CDP, the population was spread out, with 44.2% under the age of 18, 11.0% from 18 to 24, 29.4% from 25 to 44, 11.0% from 45 to 64, and 4.3% who were 65 years of age or older. The median age was 22 years. For every 100 females, there were 101.2 males. For every 100 females age 18 and over, there were 82.0 males.

The median income for a household in the CDP was $17,250, and the median income for a family was $17,250. Males had a median income of $16,250 versus $12,500 for females. The per capita income for the CDP was $4,962. About 51.0% of families and 61.3% of the population were below the poverty line, including 69.5% of those under the age of 18 and none of those 65 or over.

Education

Tradewinds is served by the Gregory-Portland Independent School District.

References

Census-designated places in San Patricio County, Texas
Census-designated places in Texas
Corpus Christi metropolitan area